Hymenopappus is a genus of flowering plants in the daisy family. Many species are known as woollywhites.

Hymenopappus is native to North America. These are biennial or perennial herbs which bear daisylike flowers.

 Species
 Hymenopappus artemisiifolius - oldplainsman - Texas Arkansas Louisiana 
 Hymenopappus biennis - biennial woollywhite - New Mexico Texas
 Hymenopappus carrizoanus - Carrizo Sands woollywhite - Texas 
 Hymenopappus filifolius - fineleaf hymenopappus - Texas + northern Baja California to Alberta + Saskatchewan
 Hymenopappus flavescens - collegeflower - Arizona New Mexico Texas Oklahoma Colorado Kansas, Chihuahua 
 Hymenopappus flavomarginatus - Coahuila, Nuevo León, San Luis Potosí
 Hymenopappus hintoniorum - Coahuila
 Hymenopappus mexicanus - Mexican woollywhite - Arizona New Mexico, Chihuahua, San Luis Potosí
 Hymenopappus newberryi - Newberry's woollywhite - New Mexico Colorado 
 Hymenopappus radiatus - ray hymenopappus - Arizona New Mexico 
 Hymenopappus scabiosaeus - Carolina woollywhite - Texas Arkansas Louisiana Oklahoma Missouri Kansas Nebraska Illinois Indiana Mississippi Alabama Georgia Florida South Carolina, Coahuila, Chihuahua 
 Hymenopappus tenuifolius - Chalk Hill woollywhite - Texas New Mexico Oklahoma Colorado Kansas Nebraska South Dakota Wyoming
 Hymenopappus wrightii  - southwestern United States, northwestern Mexico

References

External links
 USDA Plants Profile for Hymenopappus
 Jepson Manual Treatment

 
Asteraceae genera